Black Gold is the fourth studio album by American rapper Kutt Calhoun. It was released on February 26, 2013, through Strange Music, and it would be his last release with the label. The album features guest appearances from rappers such as Krizz Kaliko, Brotha Lynch Hung, Tech N9ne, Snug Brim, and Ron Ron. The album debuted at number 1 on the US Billboard Heatseekers Albums chart and at number 120 on the Billboard 200, meeting with a largely positive critical response.

Production
The album features guest appearances from Krizz Kaliko, Brotha Lynch Hung, Tech N9ne, BG Bulletwound, Snug Brim, Bishop Don Dotta, Ben-G Da Prince of Soul, The Popper, Ron Ron and Nesto The Owner.

Release and sales
It was released on February 26, 2013, through Strange Music, and it would be his last release with the label. The album debuted at number 1 on the US Billboard Heatseekers Albums chart and at number 120 on the Billboard 200, with first-week sales of 4,300 copies in the United States.

Critical response

Edwin Ortiz of HipHopDX gave the album three and a half stars out of five, saying "Black Gold revels in its ability to highlight the unique approach of Strange Music while still sounding refreshingly conventional. At 35 years young, Kutt Calhoun is picking up traction when other rappers would be given the checkered flag. Underappreciated or not, that’s something that won’t go unnoticed."

David Jeffries of AllMusic gave the album three and a half stars out of five, saying "crafting a thug party anthem out of a Willy Wonka line ('I Don't Like the Look of It') and using the '70s sitcom Three's Company as inspiration for a strip club jam ('Jack Tripper') rapper Kutt Calhoun is still the Strange Music label's strongest link to the streets, but here, he's certainly upped the funny. Maybe it's hanging around label boss Tech N9ne, who guest stars on the great 'I Been Dope' ('I been dope since Reaganomics/Son of a crack fiend, holla at me'), but most of the exciting moments on Black Gold are when Kutt goes weird and/or wild, or maybe even novelty."

Track listing

Charts

See also
Kutt Calhoun discography

References

Kutt Calhoun albums
2013 albums
Albums produced by Seven (record producer)
Strange Music albums